Robert Brenaman Wrenn Jr. (born September 11, 1959) is an American sportscaster and golf course design consultant; he is a former professional golfer who played on the PGA Tour and the Nationwide Tour.

Wrenn was born in Richmond, Virginia. He attended Wake Forest University in Winston-Salem, North Carolina, and was an all-ACC member of the golf team in each of his four years from 1978–1981. He turned pro in 1981.

Wrenn played in 308 PGA Tour events between 1982 and 1998 with 15 top-10 finishes including a victory at the 1987 Buick Open. He established the tournament record of 262 (26-under-par), which still stands. In fact, at the time this was only one stroke off the all-time PGA Tour record in a 72-hole tournament. His best finish in a major was T-25 at The Masters in 1988. Toward the end of his playing career, Wrenn played some on the Nationwide Tour. His best two finishes in that venue, both in 1995, were a T-2 at the NIKE South Carolina Classic and a T-3 at the NIKE Tri-Cities Open.

Amateur wins
1981 Trans-Mississippi Amateur

Professional wins (5)

PGA Tour wins (1)

PGA Tour playoff record (0–1)

Asia Golf Circuit wins (1)
1983 Indonesian Open

Other wins (3)
1983 Virginia Open
1989 Virginia Open
1991 Virginia Open

Results in major championships

Note: Wrenn never played in The Open Championship

CUT = missed the half-way cut
"T" = tied

See also
1984 PGA Tour Qualifying School graduates
1985 PGA Tour Qualifying School graduates
1986 PGA Tour Qualifying School graduates
1995 PGA Tour Qualifying School graduates

References

External links

American male golfers
Wake Forest Demon Deacons men's golfers
PGA Tour golfers
Golfers from Virginia
Golf writers and broadcasters
American sports announcers
Sportspeople from Richmond, Virginia
1959 births
Living people